Strongyli may refer to the following places in Greece: 

Strongyle, a former name of the island of Santorini
Strongyli Kastellorizou, a small island near Kastellorizo
Strongyli (Crete), a small island near the southeast coast of Crete